Yordan Linkov (born 26 January 1978) is a former Bulgarian footballer who played as a goalkeeper.

External links
 
 

1978 births
Living people
Bulgarian footballers
Bulgaria international footballers
Botev Plovdiv players
PFC Spartak Pleven players
PFC Akademik Svishtov players
PFC Nesebar players
PFC Cherno More Varna players
OFC Vihren Sandanski players
PFC Rodopa Smolyan players
PFC Lokomotiv Mezdra players
Olympiakos Nicosia players
First Professional Football League (Bulgaria) players
Cypriot Second Division players
Expatriate footballers in Cyprus
Association football goalkeepers
Sportspeople from Pazardzhik